North Bendigo is the sixth tram stop in Bendigo, Victoria, Australia, on the Vintage 'Talking' Tram network which is operated by Bendigo Tramways, under the supervision of The Bendigo Trust.

History
North Bendigo was opened to the public upon completion of the North Bendigo section of tramway, on 23 November 1942. The former Charing Cross - Lake Weeroona section of tramway was diverted from its former location, and on to its current location near the former Commonwealth Government Ordnance Factory, adjacent to the Yungera railway line in North Bendigo. Following the closure of the former SEC Bendigo public tramways, the stop has been used for tourism purposes, due to its close proximity to the Bendigo Joss House Temple.

Facilities
North Bendigo consists of an original 1930s tram stop shelter and has toilet facilities available (Disabled Accessible) for customers.

References

Trams in Bendigo
Bendigo